Alphaea imbuta is a moth of the family Erebidae. It was described by Francis Walker in 1855. It is found in eastern India, Nepal and Bhutan.

Subspecies
Alphaea imbuta imbuta (eastern India: north-western Himalayas, Nepal)
Alphaea imbuta sikkimensis (Rothschild, 1910) (India: Sikkim, Bhutan)

References

Moths described in 1855
Spilosomina
Moths of Asia